Big Time is the second studio album by the American country music artist Trace Adkins. It was released on October 21, 1997, and contains the singles "The Rest of Mine", "Lonely Won't Leave Me Alone" and "Big Time", which respectively reached No. 4, No. 11 and No. 27 on the Hot Country Songs charts. The album was certified Platinum by the RIAA. "Wayfaring Stranger" can be found on the Sparrow Records compilation album Amazing Grace II.

Track listing

Personnel
As listed in liner notes.

Tracks 1-10
 Trace Adkins – lead vocals
 Eddie Bayers – drums
 Bruce Bouton – steel guitar
 Paul Franklin – steel guitar
 Rob Hajacos – fiddle
 Mark Horne – acoustic guitar
 John Jarvis – keyboards, organ
 Brent Mason – electric guitar
 Scott Neubert – acoustic guitar
 Matt Rollings – keyboard, organ
 John Wesley Ryles – background vocals
 Michael Spriggs – acoustic guitar
 Dennis Wilson – background vocals
 Glenn Worf – bass guitar
 Jonathan Yudkin – mandolin

Track 11
 David Grier – acoustic guitar
 Stuart Duncan – fiddle, mandolin
 Roy Huskey, Jr. – upright bass
 Scott Neubert – Dobro
 Michael Spriggs – acoustic guitar

Charts

Weekly charts

Year-end charts

Singles

Certifications

References

1997 albums
Albums produced by Scott Hendricks
Trace Adkins albums
Capitol Records albums